Mohammed Ghanbari is an emeritus  professor in the Department of Electronic Systems Engineering focused in the areas of Video Networking at the University of Essex.

He graduated from Aryamehr University of Technology in Tehran, Iran, with a BSc degree in electrical engineering in 1970, an MSc in telecommunications, and a PhD in electronics from the University of Essex, England in 1976 and 1979 respectively. After ten years of work in radio and television broadcasting, he started his academic career in 1986 as a Research Fellow working on video coding for Packet Networks. He was then appointed as a Lecturer at the Department of Electronic Systems Engineering at Essex in 1988 and promoted to senior lecturer then reader in 1993 and 1995, respectively. He was appointed a personal chair in 1996.

He is best known for his pioneering work on two-layer video coding for  ATM networks (which earned him  IEEE Fellowship in 2001), now is known as SNR  scalability in the standard video codecs. He has registered for eleven international patents on various aspects of video networking. Mohammed was the co-recipient of A.H. Reeves prize for the best paper published in the 1995 proceedings of  IEE in the theme of digital coding. He is the co-author of Principles of Performance Engineering, book published by IEE press in 1997, the author of Video coding: an introduction to standard codecs, book also published by IEE press in 1999, which received the year 2000 best book award by IEE, and the author of Standard Codecs: Image Compression to Advanced Video coding book also published by IEE press in 2003.

He has been an organizing member of several international conferences and workshops. He was the general chair of the 1997 international workshop on Packet Video and Guest Editor to 1997 IEEE Transactions on circuits and systems for Video Technology, Special issue on Multimedia technology and applications. He has been an Associate Editor to IEEE Transactions on Multimedia (IEEE-T-MM) and represented University of Essex as one of the six academic partners in the Virtual Centre of Excellence in Digital Broadcasting and Multimedia. He is a Life Fellow of IEEE, Fellow of IEE and Charted Engineer (CEng).

References

Iranian electrical engineers
Fellow Members of the IEEE
Alumni of the University of Essex
Academics of the University of Essex
Sharif University of Technology alumni
Living people
Iranian emigrants to the United Kingdom
Year of birth missing (living people)